State Route 44 (SR 44) is a north–south state highway in the northeastern portion of the U.S. state of Ohio.  It runs from a southern terminus at State Route 43 in Waynesburg to a northern terminus at the entrance to Headlands Beach State Park near Painesville. spans from Painesville Township in the north to Waynesburg in the south. Various sections of SR 44 are named for individuals.

Major junctions

SR 44C
State Route 44C (SR 44C) is the  approach of former SR 44 to the State Route 44/State Route 5 interchange in Rootstown Township, just north of Interstate 76.

References

044
Transportation in Stark County, Ohio
Transportation in Portage County, Ohio
Transportation in Geauga County, Ohio
Transportation in Lake County, Ohio